Namita Gupta Wiggers is a noted expert in the field of contemporary craft, a curator, educator and a writer based in Portland, Oregon. Her prior experiences as a studio jeweler, video ethnographer/design researcher, and museum educator shape her multidisciplinary thinking and consideration of craft in material, conceptual, and theoretical ways.

Early life and education
She was born in Cincinnati, Ohio and received a BA in art history and English from Rice University in Houston, Texas in 1989. In 1994, she earned her MA in art history at the University of Chicago.

Career
Namita began working as a Portland-based studio jeweler who sold some of her work to the Museum of Contemporary Craft (MCC) in Portland. In 2004, she joined the MCC as the head curator, and in 2012 she was promoted to head curator and director. In 2014, Namita stepped down from her position at the Museum of Contemporary Craft.

She has lectured at The Pacific Northwest College of Art (PNCA) and teaches an MFA of Applied Craft and Design at Oregon College of Art + Craft.

Warren Wilson College appointed her director of MA in Critical and Craft Studies

In 2008, Namita Gupta Wiggers  cofounded Critical Craft Forum with Elisabeth Agro out of a desire for a place create a dialogue that spans the craft community. Namita is on the Board of Trustees to the American Craft Council and the Curatorial Board of AccessCeramics.

Publications 
Wiggers contributes to multiple online and print articles and books. She serves as the exhibition reviews editor for The Journal of Modern Craft and on the editorial board for Garland Publishing. Her publications include Unpacking the Collection (2008), Ken Shores: Clay Has the Last Word (2010), and Generations: Betty Feves (2012).

References

External links 
 Contributor page at Art Practical

1967 births
Living people
Rice University alumni
University of Chicago alumni
Writers from Cincinnati
Writers from Portland, Oregon
Oregon College of Art and Craft people
American women curators
American curators
Museum educators